The 2011 Finnish Figure Skating Championships took place between December 17 and 19, 2010 in Kupittaa of Turku. Skaters competed in the disciplines of men's singles, ladies' singles, and ice dancing on the senior and junior levels. The results were one of the criteria used to choose the Finnish teams to the 2011 World Championships, the 2011 European Championships, and the 2011 World Junior Championships.

Senior results

Men

Ladies

Ice dancing

External links
 2011 Finnish Championships results

2011
2010 in figure skating
Figure Skating Championships
International sports competitions in Turku
2011 Finnish Figure Skating Championships
December 2010 sports events in Europe